Saint-Isidore-de-Clifton is a municipality of 700 people in Le Haut-Saint-François Regional County Municipality, in Quebec, Canada on the Canada–United States border.

References

External links

Municipalities in Quebec
Incorporated places in Estrie
Le Haut-Saint-François Regional County Municipality